Carvers Creek Township is a civil township in Cumberland County, North Carolina. The population was 22,866 at the 2010 census.

References

Townships in Cumberland County, North Carolina